The Bette M. and William R. Weaver Student Observatory  is an astronomical observatory owned and operated by Monterey Institute for Research in Astronomy (MIRA).  It is located in Marina, California, adjacent to the campus of the California State University, Monterey Bay.

See also 
List of observatories
Monterey Institute for Research in Astronomy
Oliver Observing Station

References
 

Astronomical observatories in California
Buildings and structures in Monterey County, California